USCGC Waesche (WMSL-751) is the second Legend-class cutter of the United States Coast Guard.

Namesake

Waesche is named for Coast Guard Admiral Russell R. Waesche (1886–1946). Waesche graduated from the United States Revenue Cutter Service School of Instruction in 1906, was commissioned an ensign, and then served with distinction in a succession of diverse and increasingly responsible Coast Guard assignments at sea and ashore.  He served as Commandant of the Coast Guard from 1936 to 1945 during a tumultuous and eventful period in the life of the service, and was the first Coast Guardsman to achieve the rank of admiral.

History

Construction began in 2006 by Northrop Grumman's Ship System Ingalls Shipyard in Pascagoula, Mississippi.

On November 6, 2009 the Coast Guard took delivery of the Waesche.  She arrived at her homeport at Coast Guard Island, Alameda, California on February 28, 2010  and was commissioned on May 7, 2010. In 2012 Waesche became the 2nd U.S. surface combatant and the first Coast Guard cutter to use the Phalanx CIWS to defeat an unmanned aerial vehicle with a low, slow flying aircraft profile.

On 19 September 2020, the cutter was in the western Pacific where she suffered a stack fire. The blaze was controlled in ninety minutes. Five crewmen reported minor injuries and the vessel went to Yokosuka for inspection and repair. Repairs were completed in January 2021.

See also
 Integrated Deepwater System Program
 Legend-class United States Coast Guard Cutter

References

External links

USCGC Waesche Captures a Semi-Submersible
Home page
National Security Cutter Waesche (WMSL 751) - usmilnet.com - pictures and articles
National Security Cutter Gallery
National Security Cutter Home

Legend-class cutters
Ships of the United States Coast Guard
2008 ships
Ships built in Pascagoula, Mississippi